The Little Satilla River is a  freshwater tributary of the Satilla River in the U.S. state of Georgia.

The freshwater Little Satilla River forms at the juncture of Big Satilla Creek and Little Satilla Creek, close to the U.S. Route 84 crossing of the two creeks southwest of Screven. The river flows south as the boundary between Wayne and Pierce counties, then turns more southeast as it becomes the boundary between Pierce and Brantley counties.

See also
List of rivers of Georgia

References 

USGS Hydrologic Unit Map - State of Georgia (1974)

Rivers of Georgia (U.S. state)
Rivers of Wayne County, Georgia
Rivers of Pierce County, Georgia
Rivers of Brantley County, Georgia